Derek Rydall (born April 18, 1968) is an American screenwriter, screenplay consultant, script doctor, stuntman, actor and author.

Biography

Acting career
He has starred in several films & television shows with Tom Skerritt, Charles Bronson, Elliott Gould, Tony Roberts (of Woody Allen films), Paulie Shore, director John Turtletaub, and many others.  His biggest role was the lead in Phantom of the Mall: Eric's Revenge, along with Morgan Fairchild, Rob Estes, Pauly Shore, Jonathan Goldsmith and Kimber Sissons.

Screenwriter career
As a screenwriter, screenplay consultant, and script doctor, he has been on staff for Fox and Disney, developed projects for RKO, United Artists, Miramax, Fine Line, Universal, Saturn (Nicolas Cage's company), Deepak Chopra, Wildrice, Longbow, and the creators of "Air Force One" and "Ghost". Additionally, Rydall script doctored on the feature films "Diamonds" and "No Turning Back."

Author career
Rydall is the author of "I Could've Written a Better Movie than That!: How to Make Six Figures as a Screenplay Consultant – Even if You're Not a Screenwriter," and "There's No Business Like Soul Business: a Spiritual Path to Enlightened Screenwriting, Filmmaking, and Performing arts", both published by Michael Wiese Productions.

Other works
Rydall has worked one-on-one with numerous screenwriters, independent producers, and executives from around the world; and has sold, optioned, or been hired to write over 20 Film & TV projects.

Personal life
Rydall is the nephew of film director Don Siegel.

Screenwriting credits

Television
 Power Rangers Wild Force (2002)

Film
 Beethoven’s Big Break (2008)

References

External links

 Official Site
 Official Twitter page

1968 births
Living people
20th-century American male actors
American male film actors
American male television actors
Male actors from California
American film producers
American male screenwriters
Place of birth missing (living people)